Sidney Oslin Smith Jr. (December 30, 1923 – July 14, 2012) was a United States district judge of the United States District Court for the Northern District of Georgia.

Education and career

Born in Gainesville, Georgia, Smith served in the United States Army during World War II, as a Captain. Smith received an Artium Baccalaureus degree from Harvard University in 1947 and a Bachelor of Laws from the University of Georgia School of Law in 1949. He was in private practice in Gainesville from 1949 to 1962. He was an assistant solicitor general of the Northeastern Judicial Circuit of Georgia from 1951 to 1961.

Federal judicial service

On August 24, 1965, Smith was nominated by President Lyndon B. Johnson to a seat on the United States District Court for the Northern District of Georgia, vacated by Judge William Boyd Sloan. Smith was confirmed by the United States Senate on September 10, 1965, and received his commission the same day. He served as Chief Judge from 1968 until his resignation from the bench on June 1, 1974. Smith then returned to private practice in Atlanta, Georgia. He died on July 14, 2012, in Gainesville.

References

Sources
 

1923 births
2012 deaths
People from Gainesville, Georgia
Harvard University alumni
University of Georgia alumni
Judges of the United States District Court for the Northern District of Georgia
United States Army officers
United States district court judges appointed by Lyndon B. Johnson
20th-century American judges
Georgia (U.S. state) lawyers
United States Army personnel of World War II